Ypthima avanta, the jewel fourring, is a species of Satyrinae butterfly found in Asia.

References

Fauna of Pakistan
avanta
Butterflies described in 1875
Butterflies of Asia
Taxa named by Frederic Moore